Chris T. Davis (born December 1, 1983) is a former professional gridiron football wide receiver. He most recently played for the Kansas Koyotes of the Champions Professional Indoor Football League. He was signed by the Montreal Alouettes as a street free agent in 2006. He played college football at Wake Forest.  Davis has also been a member of the New York Jets, Tennessee Titans, Hamilton Tiger-Cats, Calgary Stampeders and Winnipeg Blue Bombers. 
He currently has a warrant for his arrest in Nassau County, State of New York.

External links
 Wake Forest profile
 CFL playing statistics

1983 births
Living people
American football wide receivers
American players of Canadian football
Calgary Stampeders players
Canadian football wide receivers
Hamilton Tiger-Cats players
Montreal Alouettes players
New York Jets players
Tennessee Titans players
Wake Forest Demon Deacons football players
Winnipeg Blue Bombers players
Players of American football from Atlanta